Zabihollah Rezaee (Persian: ذبیح الله رضایی) (born 1954) is an Iranian-born/American accountant, the Thompson-Hill Chair of Excellence and Professor of Accounting at the University of Memphis, USA.

Life and work 
Rezaee obtained his BS in accounting at the N.I.O.C. School of Accounting and Finance in Iran, his MBA from Tarleton State University and his Ph.D. in accounting at the University of Mississippi.

Currently, he is the secretary of the Forensic and Investigative Accounting Section of the American Accounting Association. He served two years on the Standing Advisory Group of the Public Company Accounting Oversight Board.

Selected publications 
 Financial Institutions, Valuations, Mergers, and Acquisitions: The Fair Value Approach
 Financial Statement Fraud: Prevention and Detection
 U.S. Master Auditing Guide (3rd edition)
 Audit Committee Oversight Effectiveness Post-Sarbanes-Oxley Act;
 Corporate Governance Post-Sarbanes-Oxley: Regulations, Requirements, and Integrated Processes
 Corporate Governance and Business Ethics
 Financial Services Firms: Governance, regulations, Valuations, Mergers and Acquisitions
 Corporate Sustainability: Integrating Performance and Reporting
 "Chapter 2: IRAN" (Gholam Hossein Davani and  Zabihollah Rezaee) in A Global History of Accounting, Financial Reporting and Public Policy, edited by Gary John Previts, Peter J. Walton, P. W. Wolnizer, Emerald Group Publishing Limited (July 17, 2012)

References

External links 
 Dr. Zabihollah Rezaee attends New York conference and book event, University of Memphis website.
 The Impact of Sarbanes Oxley on Accounting Firms and Financial Markets, University of Memphis website.

1954 births
Living people
Iranian emigrants to the United States
Iranian accountants
People from Isfahan
Tarleton State University alumni
University of Mississippi alumni
University of Memphis faculty